Marlowe is an unincorporated community on U.S. Route 11 in Berkeley County, West Virginia, United States.

Sites on the National Register of Historic Places located near Marlowe are: the Charles Downs II House, Harmony Cemetery, Marlowe Consolidated School, and Power Plant and Dam No. 5.

References

Unincorporated communities in Berkeley County, West Virginia
Unincorporated communities in West Virginia